Stade Barthélemy Boganda, in Bangui, is the national stadium of the Central African Republic. It is located at Complexe Sportif Barthélemy Boganda and it is currently used mostly for football matches. The stadium has a maximum capacity of 50,000 for sports matches. It is named after the former president of the country, Barthélemy Boganda.

It was first constructed in 2003 by the Chinese company Complan, it first started on 16 June 2006 and completed on 30 December by president François Bozizé

The stadium is home to one of several popular clubs in the country including AS Tempête Mocaf

References

External links
 Cafe.daum.net/stade – Stadium Pictures
 Photograph galleries including pictures of the stadium

Football venues in the Central African Republic
Athletics (track and field) venues in the Central African Republic
Central African Republic
Buildings and structures in Bangui